Lo Kin-hei (born 1 June 1984) is the Chairman of the Democratic Party and Southern District Council. He has been a Southern District Councillor for Lei Tung II constituency from 2012 to 2021.

Career
Born in 1984, Lo graduated from the University of Hong Kong with the Bachelor of Social Work in 2006. He is a registered social worker. He joined the Democratic Party and first contested in the 2007 District Council elections, contesting in the Lei Tung II constituency covering the Lei Tung Estate in Ap Lei Chau. He lost in a narrow margin of 27 votes. He contested in the same constituency in the next District Council elections in 2011 and succeeded in taking a seat with 2,346 votes.

He was also member of the pan-democratic candidate list "Demo-Social 60" in the 2011 Election Committee Subsector election for the Social Welfare Subsector and was elected.

In the party leadership election in December 2012, Lo was elected as Vice-Chairman with his senior Richard Tsoi, becoming the youngest Vice-Chairman in party's history.

After the 2019 District Council election, Lo called the vote in effect a “vote of no-confidence” in the political establishment, including Hong Kong’s leader, Carrie Lam, and key Chinese officials such as Zhang Xiaoming, head of the State Council’s Hong Kong and Macau Affairs Office.

On 15 July 2020, Lo was arrested at his home, and later released on bail, for having participated in an unauthorized protest outside Hong Kong Polytechnic University on 18 November 2019. The university campus had been the venue of major confrontations between protesters and police at that time. Lo and four others were arrested on the same day in relation to the protest, all of whom were scheduled to appear before the courts on 21 August.

References

1984 births
Alumni of the University of Hong Kong
Living people
District councillors of Southern District
Hong Kong social workers
Democratic Party (Hong Kong) politicians
Members of the Election Committee of Hong Kong, 2012–2017
Members of the Election Committee of Hong Kong, 2017–2021